Satellite Supersonic Vol. 1 is a compilation of Secret Chiefs 3 songs. All but one of the songs are by the Secret Chiefs 3's satellite bands UR, Ishraqiyun and Electromagnetic Azoth, making the album the third digital recording to feature such releases. Some of the songs were previously released as limited edition 7-inch singles, whereas others are previously unreleased tracks. The final piece is an unreleased rarity from the early years of the band, recorded in 1998. The previously released songs have seen "a full studio work-over" in 2010. Some of them feature newly recorded material.

Track listing

Personnel
 Trey Spruance — guitars (electric guitar, bass guitar, baritone guitar, Pythagorean guitar), piano, organ, percussion, glockenspiel, saz, autoharp, synthesizer, vocals, production, overdubbing, mixing, arrangement, design
 Lucas Abela — power drill
 Anonymous 13 — viola, vocals
 butcherBaker — layout
 Matt Chamberlain — drums
 Mike Dillon — vibraphone, tabla
 Rich Doucette — sarangi
 Timb Harris — violin, viola
 Danny Heifetz — drums
 Bill Horist — prepared guitar
 Shahzad Ismaily — bass guitar
 Eyvind Kang — viola
 Jesse Quattro — vocals
 Kurt Schlegel — mixing
 Ches Smith — drums

Footnotes

2010 albums
Albums produced by Trey Spruance
Web of Mimicry albums
Secret Chiefs 3 albums